The Funny Company is an American animated cartoon produced in 1963 and seen in syndication. Ken Snyder and Charles Koren produced 260 six-minute-long episodes (they later would create the cult favorite Roger Ramjet). The Mattel Corporation provided financial backing. Snyder conceived the program in response to then-Federal Communications Commission (FCC) chairman Newton N. Minow's call for more educational children's programs.

Plot

The Funny Company group resembled a club not unlike a Junior Achievement organization, that had a noseless smiley face used as the club logo; and most of the time, the stories would revolve around the Company being hired for different jobs to make a little money (yard work, house cleaning, babysitting, etc.) or doing something for charity (such as putting on shows).  As time went on, the Company decided to make Shrinkin' Violette a movie star and were on their way to Hollywood.

Members included leader Buzzer Bell (rarely seen without his Funny Company cap), inventor Jasper N (for National) Parks, club secretary Polly Plum, rotund Merry Twitter (the giggly Betty Boop-soundalike club treasurer), club mascot Terry Dactyl (an actual pterodactyl, who was frozen many years ago in prehistoric times), shy Shrinkin' Violette (who could literally become smaller if she became embarrassed), and two Native American adults--Super Chief (named after the Santa Fe Railroad's crack passenger train) whose voice was an air horn of a single-chime railroad locomotive, and his translator Broken Feather. Another adult lending a hand was Professor Todd Goodheart with his supercomputer, the Weisenheimer.

The "Villainous Meanie" of the show, Belly Laguna (who was modeled after Hungarian-American actor Bela Lugosi, in his famous Dracula role) always tried to thwart the Funny Company's plans (for his own profit), but without any success.  Another, less frequently seen adversary was a German-accented mad scientist type, Professor Ludwig Von Upp with his assistant Hans Von Henchman.

Each segment included a two-minute live-action short educational film, reinforcing the topic being discussed. Initially produced in black and white, the series switched after one season to full color,  the closing credits ended with the message, "Keep Smiling!"

Syndication
The series was originally syndicated to local stations around the country, normally as part of a locally-produced children's show. The show first aired on both ABC and NBC affiliate (now only NBC) KOMU-TV Channel 8 in Jefferson City, Missouri on September 21, 1963, and was later carried on WOR-TV New York City three days later.

Formerly throughout its history, The Funny Company was broadcast on TBN's Smile of a Child TV network (now Smile) early on Monday mornings and late Friday nights until the show was pulled off the air in June 2016. This series was also known as a Chicago television original, especially on WGN-TV's Garfield Goose And Friends and in the 1980s on WPWR-TV.

The series sold internationally and ran for several years in Ireland.

Voice cast
Dick Beals—Buzzer Bell, Jasper N. Parks
Robie Lester—Polly Plum
Nancy Wible—Merry Twitter, Shrinkin' Violette
Ken Snyder—Terry Dactyl, Additional voices (also producer)
Tom Thomas—Broken Feather, Additional voices
Hal Smith—Dr. Todd Goodheart, Dr. Ludwig Von Upp, Belly Laguna, Weisenheimer, Hans Von Henchman, Additional voices

Credits
Executive Producer: Kenneth C.T. Snyder
Producer: Sam Nicholson
Co-Producer: Leo Salkin
Written and Created by Kenneth C.T. Snyder
Musical Direction: Jack Fascinato
Animators: Bob Bemiller, Brad Case, John Sparey, John Walker
Layout: Norm Gottfredson
Backgrounds: Rosemary O'Connor
Animation Checking: Maggi (Alcumbrac) Raymond
Picture and Sound Editor: Norm Vizents
Production Coordinator: Dave Hoffman

References

External links

American children's animated comedy television series
American children's animated education television series
American children's animated fantasy television series
1960s American animated television series
First-run syndicated television programs in the United States
1963 American television series debuts
1964 American television series debuts
Mattel